Henry Patrick Procter or Proctor (1763–31 October 1822) was a British major-general who served in Canada during the War of 1812.  He is best known as the commander who was decisively defeated in 1813 by the Americans and left western Upper Canada in American hands. Procter is regarded by many as an inept leader who relied heavily on textbook procedure. His "going by the book" is attributed to his lack of any combat experience before coming to Canada.

Early life
Procter was born in Ireland. His father, Richard Procter, was a surgeon in the British Army. Henry Procter began his military career at the age of 18 as an ensign in the 43rd Regiment of Foot in April 1781. He served as a lieutenant in New York in the final months of the American War of Independence. His promotion was slow, probably indicating a lack of means, since commissions were usually obtained by purchase. Procter became a captain in November 1792. He was promoted to major three years later in May 1795, and on 9 October 1800 became a lieutenant colonel in command of the 1st battalion of the 41st Regiment of Foot. Procter joined his new regiment in Lower Canada in 1802. He served in Canada for the next ten years. Inspecting officers, including Major-General Isaac Brock, noted that Procter's regiment was "very sharp", indicating a good standard of drill and discipline, and that this was due to Procter's "indefatigable industry".

War of 1812

When the war began in June 1812, the 41st were stationed in Upper Canada. Procter was sent to Amherstburg near the westernmost part of the province, to relieve the commandant of Fort Malden and defend the fort against a possible American assault. He fought several skirmishes, which helped isolate the American post at Fort Detroit and contributed to its capture by General Brock. When Brock departed, Procter was left in command on the Detroit frontier. He was soon faced with an attack by American General William Henry Harrison, who intended to expel the British from Michigan.

Procter won a resounding victory over an American brigade commanded by Brigadier-General James Winchester at the Battle of Frenchtown, though his tactics did not escape criticism. He had allowed his men to open fire too soon, which alerted the Americans to his attack. He also placed his artillery within American rifle range, which resulted in his gunners becoming casualties unnecessarily. Nevertheless, his surprise attack overwhelmed the Americans and forced Winchester to surrender. Following his victory, he learned that General Harrison's main army was coming to Winchester's support. Procter had only enough carts to transport his own severely wounded, and in his haste to retreat, he left 68 severely wounded American prisoners behind with only a small guard of Canadian militiamen. That night, Procter's Indian allies murdered the wounded prisoners in what became known as the Massacre of the River Raisin. This gave American troops a new battle-cry: "Remember the Raisin!"

On 8 February 1813, Procter was promoted to brigadier general by Sir George Prévost, the Governor General of Canada. A few months later, he was made a major general.

In April and May 1813, Procter besieged Harrison at Fort Meigs, Ohio. His artillery pounded the fort for days but the muddy ground inside the fort absorbed most of the cannonballs. On 5 May 1813, at the Battle of the Miami Rapids, Procter and the Indians inflicted a devastating defeat on Brigadier-General Green Clay's brigade of Kentucky militia, who were trying to reinforce the garrison. A sortie from the fort by Harrison's command was also turned back. Many American prisoners were taken, and 38 wounded men who had been captured were moved to the disused Fort Miami. Once again, some of the wounded prisoners were massacred by Indians who had arrived too late to take part in the battle. The Shawnee chief Tecumseh reviled Procter for his failure to prevent the killings. The siege ultimately ended in failure, as did the subsequent Battle of Fort Stephenson.

On 20 June, Procter's command was recognised as the "Right Division of the Army of Upper Canada". However, he received very few reinforcements and his "division" consisted essentially of the 41st Foot only, with whatever militia could be gathered for any operation and unreliable numbers of Native Americans.

Following an American naval victory in the Battle of Lake Erie, Procter's supply lines were cut, and he was forced to retreat from Detroit and Amherstburg towards Burlington Heights at the western end of Lake Ontario, to obtain supplies. Tecumseh reviled Procter for retreating as "a fat animal which slinks away, its tail between its legs" and demanded that Fort Malden be handed over to the Natives to defend. However, there was no food for them and the fort's artillery had been placed on the British fleet for the naval battle and was consequently lost. Tecumseh and his warriors were forced to accompany Procter as he retreated.

Procter's retreat was slow and poorly organised, and the Americans under Harrison caught up with him near Moraviantown. By now, Procter's troops were exhausted and starving on half-rations. At the Battle of the Thames, the 41st fired a single ineffectual volley before breaking. About 250 fled and the remainder (under 600) surrendered, leaving their Indian allies to fight alone. Tecumseh and Roundhead were killed and their forces soundly defeated.

Procter claimed he had attempted to rally his troops before he galloped off himself, but this was generally disbelieved. He admitted the conduct of the 41st Foot "was not upon this unfortunate occasion, such as I have on every other witnessed with pride and satisfaction ...". Having rallied some men at the Grand River, Procter recommended that there was no need to abandon Burlington Heights. However, his division was disbanded, his remaining men merged into the "Centre Division", and Procter himself was relieved of duty.

Court-martial
In December 1814, Procter was tried by court martial at Quebec for his conduct during the retreat and at the Battle of the Thames. He was found guilty of "deficiency in energy and judgement", and suspended for six months without pay. The Prince Regent insisted that the findings and sentence be read to every regiment in the Army. Procter's sentence was later reduced to a reprimand, but the conviction effectively ended his military service.

Procter returned to England in 1815, but was semi-retired. He died in 1822 at the age of 59 in Bath.

Evaluation
Opinions on Procter are divided. Some scholars dismiss him as incompetent, while others point out that he was denied adequate resources by his superiors and was unfairly held responsible for the conduct of his Indian allies (except where accompanied by Tecumseh himself). Most sources agree that Procter was a good regimental officer, but was out of his depth when in charge of an independent command, especially one which required him to handle unpredictable Native American allies. Procter never achieved the instant rapport with Tecumseh which Brock had gained, and Tecumseh was dismissive or even contemptuous towards Procter on occasions such as the Battle of Miami Rapids and the retreat from Amherstburg. Procter's conduct at the Battle of the Thames bears a strong correlation with signs of (then undiagnosable) battle fatigue, after a long campaign with insufficient supplies.

The Canadian historian Pierre Berton concludes:

To the Americans he remains a monster, to the Canadians a coward. He is neither--merely a victim of circumstances, a brave officer but weak, capable enough except in moments of stress, a man of modest pretensions....The prisoner of events beyond his control, Procter dallied and equivocated until he was crushed. His career is ended.

Personal life
Procter married Elizabeth Cockburn in Kilkenny in Ireland, in 1792. They had one son and four daughters.

Citations

Sources

Further reading
 Antal, Sandy. (1997) A Wampum Denied: Procter's War of 1812. Carleton University Press: Ottawa, Ontario.

External links
Text of the verdict of Procter's court martial, from The Documentary History of the campaign upon the Niagara frontier (p. 162)

1763 births
1822 deaths
British Army generals
British Army personnel of the American Revolutionary War
British Army personnel of the War of 1812
British Army personnel who were court-martialled
41st Regiment of Foot officers
43rd Regiment of Foot officers
British people of the War of 1812
British military personnel of the War of 1812